The Men's 3 metre springboard competition at the 2019 World Aquatics Championships was held on 17 and 18 July 2019.

Results
The preliminary round was started on 17 July at 10:00. The semifinal was held on 17 July at 15:30. The final was held on 18 July at 20:45.

Green denotes finalists

Blue denotes semifinalists

References

Men's 3 metre springboard